James Quigley may refer to:

 James Edward Quigley (1854–1915), Archbishop of Chicago
 James M. Quigley (1918–2011), United States Representative from Pennsylvania 
 James L. Quigley, member of the California legislature
 James F. Quigley (1859–1935), American lawyer and politician from New York
 James Quigley (hurler), Irish hurler